John Tucker Must Die is a 2006 teen comedy film directed by Betty Thomas. The film is about a trio of teenage girls who plot to break the heart of school basketball star John Tucker after they learn he has been secretly dating all three and pledging each is "the one". They recruit a shy, unpopular girl in their scheme to publicly humiliate him. Released in North America on July 28, 2006, the film made $68 million worldwide.

Plot
Teenaged Kate Spencer lives with her single mother, Lori, near Portland, Oregon, where Kate works as a waitress. While at work, Kate sees popular local boy John Tucker on dates with three different girls: chronic overachiever Carrie, head cheerleader Heather, and promiscuous vegan activist Beth. Kate learns from a co-worker that John dates girls from different cliques at his school so that they never interact. John convinces the girls to keep their relationships secret by claiming his father forbids him to date during basketball season.

The three girls learn about John's scheme after ending up on the same team in gym class. The girls enlist Kate's help in seeking revenge against John. Meanwhile, Kate becomes friends with John's brother Scott. The girls make several attempts to bring John down, but these initial pranks backfire. John breaks up with all three girls, and they agree that breaking his heart is the ideal revenge. They enlist Kate to be the heartbreaker.

After a makeover, Kate joins the cheerleading squad to get John's attention. He tries to flirt with her, but Kate dismisses him. John is dismayed that a girl is impervious to his charms, being shy, and becomes determined to win her affections. He relentlessly chases after Kate, even driving by her house, much to the girls' amusement as they watch him fall for her.

After a few dates, Beth notices that Kate is falling for John. To counteract this, Carrie secretly videotapes John bragging to his friends in the locker room, saying he will be "scoring more than baskets" at the upcoming away game. Upon seeing John's chauvinistic behavior, Kate recommits to the plan.

At a hotel on the night of the away game, Kate seduces John on a video-chat, instructing him to put on a lacy pair of girl's thong panties and climb out of his room and into hers. He mistakenly climbs into a teacher's room instead, and becomes the laughingstock of the school. John again uses this to his advantage, convincing the boys on his team that wearing the thong panties improves his game. Meanwhile, Kate's mother and Scott both discover the plan and lament the change in Kate's behavior.

Kate tells John that she heard about what he said in the locker room. John makes amends by giving her his watch and asking her to be his girlfriend. Kate tells Heather, Carrie, and Beth that she wants to be out of the plan, as whether they are dating or plotting to destroy John, it is still all about him. At John's birthday, the tape the girls made of John's destruction is played, and Kate reveals the entire plot in front of a devastated John.

Heather, Beth, and Carrie defend Kate after a guest throws his drink at her. Still, John appears unfazed, and the party devolves into a cake fight. A few days later, John and Kate agree to be friends, and John resolves to be honest. Scott, happy that Kate confessed, becomes her lab partner again, and it is hinted the two will begin dating.

Cast

Reception

Box office
The film premiered at Grauman's Chinese Theatre, with Betty Thomas and Arielle Kebbel in attendance.
In its opening weekend, the film grossed a total of $14.3 million, ranking third in the box office results for that weekend. The film went on to gross $41.9 million in the United States and Canada, and a total of $68.8 million worldwide. The opening weekend 3rd place rank was at the high-end of studio expectations. The film was heavily promoted to female teenagers on Myspace, and the studio believed this campaign was successful, as the opening weekend audience was 75% female and 68% under 25.

Critical response 

On Rotten Tomatoes, the film has an approval rating of 27% based on 95 reviews, with an average rating of 4.5/10. The site's critical consensus reads, "This derivative teen comedy tries to go for cute when it could use more bite." On Metacritic assigned the film a weighted average score of 41 out of 100, based on 27 critics, indicating "mixed or average reviews". Audiences polled by CinemaScore gave the film an average grade of "B+" on an A+ to F scale.

Angel Cohn of TV Guide gave the film a three stars rating out of four, writing that the 19 to 27 year old age range of the six leads meant that "not one member of this teen picture's cast appears remotely young enough to be in high school", though adding that "veteran director Betty Thomas' light revenge comedy is surprisingly entertaining, if less than original." Cohn concluded, "Teen comedies are notoriously predictable, and screenwriter Jeff Lowell isn't out to rock the genre boat, but his smartly written dialogue and the infectious charm of the cast, particularly Snow and Metcalfe, add up to a winning combination."

Jeannette Catsoulis of The New York Times wrote that the film is "unforgivably clueless about teen culture" and "can't even sustain the courage of its girl-power convictions."  Catsoulis was also critical of Metcalfe's "unconvincing" performance, writing that he musters "fewer expressions than a Botox infomercial."

Michael Medved gave John Tucker Must Die two stars out of four, calling it "slick, stupid and slightly sleazy," and that at the half-way mark, the plot collapses. He praised Jenny McCarthy, in a supporting role, saying she "...is notably better than the rest of the cast." Medved concedes that his 17-year-old daughter was more the target demographic and that she liked the film enough to want to watch it again.
James Berardinelli of ReelViews also disliked the film. He gave it 1.5 stars out of 4, saying "The gulf is vast between what the studio wants us to think John Tucker Must Die is and what it really is. The marketers and publicists would have us believe this is a dark, edgy teen comedy about a band of two-timed girls taking revenge on the school's biggest hunk. Unfortunately, Betty Thomas' film is neither dark nor edgy (although it occasionally tries masquerading in those categories), nor is it particularly funny." He goes on to mention "The movie may be able to bamboozle a few teen female fans into multiplexes, but it's hard to imagine any of them – even those who swoon at the sight of Jesse Metcalfe – labeling this as better than forgettable. And for anyone outside that demographic unfortunate enough to endure John Tucker Must Die, the memory will be too painful to fade quickly."

Jenny McCarthy's performance in the film earned her a Razzie Award nomination for Worst Supporting Actress.

Music
From 6 April 2006 to 24 April 2006, unsigned artists were allowed to submit their music for an online contest on MySpace called The John Tucker Must Die Undiscovered Band Contest. The winning band's song was eligible for inclusion in the movie and on the soundtrack. From these initial submissions, 20 semi-finalists were chosen by members of the MySpace staff. On 1 May 2006, those 20 bands relied on the support of their own fan bases, or MySpace 'friends,' to determine the top 10 finalists who were selected on 19 May 2006. The grand prize winner was chosen on 26 May 2006 by a panel of celebrity judges and music executives. Texas pop/punk band Rockett Queen's song "Next Big Thing" was chosen as the grand prize winner.

The John Tucker Must Die Undiscovered Band Contest was hosted by Stefy Rae of the band Stefy. Stefy's Wind-up Records debut was released on 29 August 2006. Two songs from the female-fronted band Stefy were featured in the film as well as songs from The All-American Rejects, Nada Surf, Ben Lee, OK Go, People in Planes, and Motion City Soundtrack, among others.

Track listing 

 The All-American Rejects – "Dirty Little Secret"
 Cartel – "Honestly"
 Stefy – "Chelsea"
 Rock Kills Kid – "Hope Song"
 People in Planes – "Instantly Gratified"
 Motion City Soundtrack – "Better Open the Door"
 Quietdrive – "Time After Time"
 Stefy – "Fool for Love"
 OK Go – "This Will Be Our Year"
 Nada Surf – "I Like What You Say"
 Ben Lee – "Float On"
 Josh Kelley – "Sunset Lover"
 Caesars – "We Got to Leave"
 Rockett Queen – "The Next Big Thing"
 Hudson – "Not Giving Up"
 Taxi Doll – "Waiting"

Home media

The DVD was released on November 14, 2006.

References

External links

 Official Website
 
 
 
 
 

2006 films
2006 romantic comedy films
2000s female buddy films
2000s high school films
2000s teen comedy films
20th Century Fox films
American basketball films
American female buddy films
American films about revenge
American high school films
American romantic comedy films
American teen comedy films
2000s English-language films
Canadian teen comedy films
Dune Entertainment films
Films about infidelity
Films directed by Betty Thomas
Films scored by Richard Gibbs
Films set in Portland, Oregon
Films shot in Vancouver
Films about murder
Canadian basketball films
2000s American films
2000s Canadian films